Jean Matheus (1590–1672) was a 17th-century French engraver who flourished during the 1620s. He is best known for his work in Nicholas Renouard's edition of Ovid's Metamorphoses, published in Paris in 1619 and engraved portraits of saints.

External links

 Nicholas Renouard, Les Métamorphoses d'Ovide, ill. Jean Mathieu (Paris, 1619.)
 Portraits by Jean Matheus (Réunion des musées nationaux)

1590 births
1672 deaths
17th-century French engravers